William Temple Memorial Church is a parish church in Wythenshawe, Manchester, dedicated to the bishop William Temple.

It is a Grade II listed building, designed by George Pace in the Modernist style, and built in 1964–1965.  It has a pitched roof with dormer windows.

References

Church of England church buildings in Greater Manchester
Grade II listed buildings in Manchester
20th-century Church of England church buildings